The statue of Taras Shevchenko is an outdoor sculpture by Valentyn Znoba, installed in Smíchov, Prague, in the Czech Republic.

See also

 Legacy of Taras Shevchenko

External links
 

Monuments and memorials in Prague
Outdoor sculptures in Prague
Sculptures of men in Prague
Statues in Prague
Smíchov
Monuments and memorials to Taras Shevchenko